Ready or Not  is Cantopop artist Miriam Yeung's third Mandarin solo studio album. It was released by East Asia Music on 8 March 2011.  This is also the first Mandarin album Miriam had in eight years.

The album includes nine tracks, one of which was featured on the original soundtrack of Perfect Wedding.

Track listing
 Ready or not
 女人三十 (When A Woman Reaches Thirty)
 哭出來  (Cry)
 聖女不敗  (Strong Lady Never Fails)
 有種沉默叫想念 (Yearning is a Type of Silence)
 醒了 (Awake)
 還未完成的拼圖 (Puzzle Yet to be Finished)
 未完的歌 (Unfinished Song – Perfect Wedding Commercial Song)
 我係我 remix (I am Me – Cantonese)

Music videos
 Ready Or Not MV
 女人三十 (Women, Thirty) MV
 醒了 (Awake) MV

References

2010 albums
Miriam Yeung albums